Sankt Peter am Kammersberg is a small village in Austria in the state of Styria with 2,076 inhabitants (as of 2016-01-01). It was first mentioned in documents in the year 1007.

The municipality is divided as follow:

 Althofen 
 Feistritz
 Kammersberg
 Mitterdorf
 Peterdorf
 Pöllau am Greim
 St. Peter

References

External links 
 

Cities and towns in Murau District